A golden age is a period considered the peak in the history of a country or people, a time period when the greatest achievements were made. The term originated from early Greek and Roman poets, who used it to refer to a time when mankind lived in a better time and was pure (see Golden Age).

The ancient Greek poet Hesiod introduced the term in his Works and Days, when referring to the period when the "Golden Race" of man lived. This was part of fivefold division of Ages of Man, starting with the Golden age, then the Silver Age, the Bronze Age, the Age of Heroes (including the Trojan War), and finally, the current Iron Age. The concept was further refined by Ovid, in his Metamorphoses, into the four "metal ages" (golden, silver, bronze, and iron).

The Golden age in Classic literature

The Golden age as described by Hesiod was an age where all humans were created directly by the Olympian gods. They lived long lives in peace and harmony, and were oblivious of death. The "Golden race" were however mortals, but would die peacefully and in their sleep unmarked by sickness and age. Ovid emphasizes the justice and peace that defined the Golden Age. He described it as a time before man learned the art of navigation, and as a pre-agricultural society. The idea of a Golden age lingered in literature and historical understanding throughout the Greek and Roman periods. It was partly replaced by the Christian Six Ages of the World based on the biblical chronology in the early Middle Ages.

Evolution from period to metaphor
The term "Golden age" has always had a metaphoric element. A few centuries after Hesiod, Plato pointed out that the "Golden race" were not made from gold as such, but that the term should be understood metaphorically. The classical idea of the "metal ages" as actual historical periods held sway throughout the Greek and Roman periods. While supplemented by St. Augustine's "Six Ages of the World", the classical ideas were never entirely eradicated, and it resurfaced to form the basis of division of time in early archaeology.

At the birth of modern archaeology in the 18th century, the "Golden age" was associated with a pre-agricultural society. However, already in the 16th century, the term "Golden age" was replaced by "Stone Age" in the three-age system. Still, Rousseau used the term for a loosely defined historical period characterized by the "State of nature" as late as the late 18th century. While the concept of an Iron and Bronze Age are still used by historians and archaeologists, the "Golden age" of Hesiod was a purely mythical period, and has come to signify any period in history where the state of affairs for a specific phenomenon appear to have been on their height, better than in the periods proceeding it and following the "Golden Age". It is sometimes still employed for the hunter-gatherer tribal societies of the Mesolithic, but only as a metaphor.

Golden Age in society timeline

A society's Golden Age marks that period in its history having a heightened output of art, science, literature, and philosophy.

Ancient Egypt experienced several Golden Ages, including the Fourth Dynasty during the Old Kingdom, as well as the New Kingdom
 The Belle Epoque period is considered France's golden age as it was a time when culture, science, and living standards reached their peak
Athenian Golden Age presided by Pericles
 14th & 15th century Africa were a golden age for West Africa, when trade routes flourished, leading to the advancement of Mathematics and Science.
 The Elizabethan era the reign of Queen Elizabeth I (1558–1603) traditionally viewed by English people as the golden age of England.
Golden age of Latin literature, the period in Latin literature between Cicero and Ovid
The age of the "Five Good Emperors" during the Principate, part of the Pax Romana period, is generally considered the zenith of the Roman Empire, and Edward Gibbon even considered it the happiest age of humanity
Golden age of India, the period between the 3rd century to the 6th century CE under the leadership of the Gupta Empire, during which Indians made great achievements in mathematics, science, culture, religion, philosophy and astronomy
The Classic Period of Mesoamerica (3rd to 9th century), the era when Teotihuacan dominated central Mexico and several important Maya city states reached their apogee
Early Christian Ireland, when Ireland was united under one High King and was significant in European art
Islamic Golden Age
Reign of Harun al-Rashid (786–809), the height of the Abbasid Caliphate, before the Fourth Fitna, the Anarchy at Samarra, and the onset of political fragmentation
More generally from the reign of Harun al-Rashid until the sack of Baghdad by the Mongols (1258) in the Arab world
Reignited in the 15th century in the Age of the Islamic Gunpowders (Ottoman, Safavid, and Mughal Empires) until the early 17th century  (1453-1683)

Byzantine Empire under the Macedonian dynasty (867–1056), has been dubbed the "Golden Age" of Byzantium
Golden Age of Bulgaria, the reign of Emperor Simeon I the Great, late 9th – early 10th centuries
Golden age of Kiev, 10th century
 China has had multiple golden ages, with the Han, Tang, Song, Ming and Qing all considered golden ages in Chinese history. The "Chinese Golden Age" is used to refer to the period of the Tang and Song Dynasties from 618 to 1279, which saw an economic revolution
Golden age of Jewish culture in the Iberian Peninsula, the period between 900 and 1100. Sometimes categorized as part of the larger Islamic Golden Age, because of the event's timeframe and geography
Golden age of Christian monasticism, 8th–12th centuries, its peak being 11th century to early-mid 12th century. Understood to be a golden age in the European continent of strictly religious matters, and not in comparison to other golden ages of the era
Golden Age of medieval Bulgarian culture, a golden age in Bulgaria
Georgian Golden Age, the period of prosperity and cultural flourishing in the Kingdom of Georgia in the 11th, 12th, and early 13th centuries, especially under Queen Tamar the Great
Golden Age in Indonesian history from about 1293 to around 1500 when the Hindu–Buddhist Majapahit kingdom in eastern Java, under Gajah Mada, extended its influence to much of southern Malay Peninsula, Borneo, Sumatra, and Bali. 
Second Golden Age of Bulgaria, the prosperity of Bulgarian culture, literature and arts during Emperor Ivan Alexander (1331–1371)
Portuguese Golden Ages
Portuguese Golden Age, 15th century – 1580. Possibly the European power of the time most proficient in sailing
Second Portuguese Golden Age, Brazilian gold rush, late 17th century to 19th century
Golden age of Valencian literature, 15th century
Ottoman Golden Age, 1480s–1560s, partly under the reign of Suleiman the Magnificent
The High Renaissance of the 16th century is often described as the "golden age" of the culture and art of Renaissance Italy
The history of Malta under the Order of Saint John (1530–1798) is generally considered as a "golden age" of architecture, the arts, health and education, especially between the late 1560s and the early 1770s
The Spanish Golden Age (siglo de oro) corresponds to the reign of the Catholic Monarchs and of the Habsburgs between 1492 and 1659, a period marked by a powerful Spanish Empire and by the flourishing of the arts
English Golden Ages
The "Golden Age of England" is the Elizabethan era, under Elizabeth I of England, in the late 16th century, as her reign is often depicted as a golden age and the high point of the English Renaissance
The "Golden Age of Britain" is the Victorian era, under Queen Victoria, in the 19th century
Polish Golden Age, 16th century, early 17th century
Dutch Golden Age, 17th century, approximately 1588–1672
Golden Age of Dutch Painting, spanning the 17th century
Golden Age of Netherlandish cartography, c. 1590s–1720s
Golden age of Belarusian history, 1500s–1570s, esp. 1550s–1570s
Grand Siècle, the reigns of Louis XIII and Louis XIV.
The Golden Age of Piracy, 1650–1730
The Genroku era (1688–1704) in Japan is widely considered a "golden age" for literature, drama, and the arts
Danish Golden Age, first half of the 19th century
Golden Age of Russian Poetry, first half of the 19th century, with Russian poets Pushkin, Lermontov, Tyutchev and others
Golden Age of Capitalism, a period of rapid growth in the economies of the west, and Japan, from 1945 to 1970. Also used for the Gilded Age of the late 19th century
The Golden Twenties, the 1920s in Europe, the Roaring Twenties were the American equivalent
Likewise in the United States, the American Century may be taken to represent a golden age of global cultural influence and political hegemony

Culture and technology

A golden age is often ascribed to the years immediately following some technological innovation. During this time  writers and artists ply their skills in this new medium.  Therefore, there are Golden Ages of both radio and television.  During such a nascent phase the technology allows new ideas to be expressed, as new art-forms flower quickly into new areas:

Golden age of Chocolate, 1850-1900
Golden age of illustration, a period in US illustration history from the 1880s to the 1910s.
The golden age of board games, 1880s-1920s
The Golden Age of Radio, 1920s–1940s
The Golden Age of American animation, between 1928 (sound) and the 1960s (television).
 The Golden Age of Hollywood, which lasted from the end of the silent era in American cinema in the late 1920s to the 1960s
Golden Age of Television (referring to U.S. television circa 1950s) when television was still a fairly recent invention. Programs such as Kraft Television Theatre, Playhouse 90, and later Alfred Hitchcock Presents and The Twilight Zone brought a level of writing to American commercial television that would rarely be seen in the next several decades.
Golden age of Gameshows, late 50s to early 60s
Golden Age of Muscle Cars, 1964–1972.
Golden Age of Pornography, refers to a 15-year period (around 1969–1984) in commercial American pornography, which spread internationally, in which sexually-explicit films gained positive attention from mainstream cinemas, movie critics, and the general public. It began with release of the 1969 film Blue Movie directed by Andy Warhol, and the 1970 film Mona produced by Bill Osco. Those were the first adult erotic films, depicting explicit sex, to receive wide theatrical release in the United States. During that period, pornographic films emerged from underground studios, and became a full-scale industry with aspirations to become part of mainstream cinema.
Golden Age of the Music Video, 1975–2000, a period that started with the release of "Bohemian Rhapsody" by Queen
Golden Age of Arcade Video Games, the late 1970s to 1980s
Golden age of anime, 1982–1997 (from 24 frames per second to the beginning of the CGI era)
 Golden Era of Spanish Software, 1983–1992
 The Golden Age of Radio-Controlled Buggies, 1983–1992. A period when model companies shifted towards practical electric-powered buggies, leading to numerous companies (including toy manufacturers) entering the market and helping it to become the dominant class.
 Golden age of hip hop, mid 1980s–mid 1990s a period when hip-hop music was arguably at its creative and artistic peak
 Golden age of Manga, 1980s-1990s
 Golden age of PC Games, 1990 to the early 2000s
 Second Golden Age of Television, 1999–present, a period of high-quality and often scripted American television programming that started with The Sopranos, The Wire, Breaking Bad, and Mad Men (among others)
 Golden Age of Viral Videos, 2005–present, a period that started with the launch of YouTube and continues today.
 Golden age of race queens had enjoyed two eras; the first was the swimsuit clad race queen bubble of the late 1980s to late 1990s and the miniskirted second golden age of race queen of the 2000s, when the influx of models came with the ability to draw the same as or bigger popularity than some of the drivers competing in the events.

At least one technology had its "Golden Age" in its latter years:
 The Golden Age of Sail, 19th century.

A cultural "golden age" can feature in the construction of a national myth.

Genres

Technology and creativity spawn new genres or new surges in the production of literature and the arts. The onset (or dominance or heyday) of a new genre/movement, in popular parlance, becomes its "Golden Age". For example:

 Golden age of Swordplay, period of sword skills from the 16th to the 18th centuries
 Golden Age of Broadway, the period from about 1943 to 1968 that brought musicals like Oklahoma! (1943); Kiss Me, Kate (1948); West Side Story (1957); The Sound of Music (1959); and Hello, Dolly! (1964) to the Broadway stage
 Golden Age of British dance bands, 1920s–1930s
 Golden Age of the British whodunit, early 20th-century
 Golden Age of Comic Books, period between roughly 1938 and 1945, though exact definitions vary
 Golden Age of Mexican cinema, beginning in 1935 and ending in the late 1950s
 Golden Age of Science Fiction, period from the late 1930s through the 1950s
 Golden Age of the Western, of the Western movie, 1930s–1960s
 Golden Age of Detective Fiction, an era of detective fiction between World Wars I and II, epitomised by Agatha Christie
 Golden age of the Italian horror movie ( 1957–1979)
 Golden age of Japanese cinema, 1950s
 The golden age of Fast Food buffets, 1980s to the early 1990s
 Golden Age of romantic comedies, 1990s
 Golden age of J-horror, 1999 to 2005
 The golden age of console RPGs, 1990s to early 2000s

Science
 Golden age of cosmology (1992–present)
 Golden age of general relativity, upon its entering the mainstream of theoretical physics, 1960–1975.
 Golden age of physics (19th century) with modern physics (quantum mechanics and the theory of relativity)

Senior citizen
Companies will use "Golden Age" as a marketing euphemism to replace "senior citizen":

Golden Age Passport, a National Park Service pass for citizens who are 62 or older.

Sport

 The golden age of alpinism (1854–1865), during which many major Alpine peaks saw their first ascents.
 The Golden Age of cricket (1890–1914)
 Golden age of baseball (1920–1960)
 Golden age of American soccer (1921-1931)
Golden Age of Roller Skating (1937–1959) 
Golden age of Bowling (1940s-1970s) 
Golden Age of American Football (1950s-1960s) 
 Golden Age of Trans-Am Series (1968–1972)
Golden Age of Rallying (1983–1986). A period where car manufacturers were given carte blanche in terms of vehicle design, resulting in spectacular high powered cars that drew the sport to the height of its popularity.

See also
Gilded Age
Heroic Age (disambiguation)
Silver age
Bronze Age (disambiguation)

Notes

Sources

 
Historiography
Nostalgia